Tecia venosa is a moth in the family Gelechiidae. It was described by Arthur Gardiner Butler in 1883. It is found in Argentina, Chile and Colombia.

The larvae feed on Baccharis macrantha.

References

Tecia
Moths described in 1883